The 2016 SVGFF Premier Division is the sixth season of top-tier football in Saint Vincent and the Grenadines under its current format, and it is also the 11th season of top flight football altogether. The defending champions are Hope International, who won the title in 2014 (no competition was held in 2015).

Clubs 

Avenues United (Kingstown)
Bequia United
BESCO Pastures
Camdonia Chelsea
Dove
Greggs
Hope International
Je Belle
Parkside Rollers
Prospect United
Sion Hill
SV United
System 3
Toni Store Jugglers

Table

References 

NLA Premier League
Saint Vincent and the Grenadines
football
football